Craig Alexander Sibbald (born 18 May 1995) is a Scottish professional footballer who plays as a midfielder for Dundee United. He has previously played for Falkirk and Livingston, and represented Scotland at under-16 and under-17 level.

Club career

Falkirk
Sibbald made his first team debut for Falkirk aged 16, in a 2–1 win against Brechin City in the 2011–12 Scottish Challenge Cup. This was quickly followed by his first start in the league on 6 August against Raith Rovers.

Sibbald signed a contract extension with Falkirk on 3 July 2014, which contracted him to the club until 2017. He signed a new one-year contract with Falkirk on 11 August 2017, after an unsuccessful trial with Luton Town.

Livingston
Sibbald signed for newly promoted Scottish Premiership club Livingston on 30 May 2018 on a two-year contract.

Dundee United
During July 2022 Sibbald joined Dundee United on a two-year deal.

International career
Sibbald was capped three times for the Scottish under-16 team from 2010 to 2011. On 17 August 2011, Sibbald was called up to the Scottish under-17 team to participate in the 2011 International Youth Toto Cup. He was capped twice for Scotland at under-17 level in 2012.

Career statistics

Honours

Club
Falkirk
Scottish Challenge Cup: 2011–12

Individual
Scottish Football League Young Player of the Month: August 2011

References

External links
Profile at the Livingston F.C. website

1995 births
Living people
Footballers from Falkirk
Scottish footballers
Scotland youth international footballers
Association football midfielders
Falkirk F.C. players
Livingston F.C. players
Scottish Football League players
Scottish Professional Football League players
People educated at Graeme High School
Dundee United F.C. players